Wuqiu (Wuchiu) may refer to - 
Wuqiu Jian or Muqiu Jian (毋丘儉), a general during China's Three Kingdoms Period 
Wuqiu, Kinmen, Fujian, Republic of China (Taiwan)